Charles Allan Cameron (25 May 1886 – 27 February 1957) was an  Australian rules footballer who played with South Melbourne and Geelong in the Victorian Football League (VFL).

Notes

External links 

1886 births
1957 deaths
Australian rules footballers from Melbourne
Sydney Swans players
Geelong Football Club players